Joseph Rusling Meeker (born in Newark, New Jersey, 21 April 1827; died in St. Louis, Missouri, 27 September 1887) was a United States painter.

Biography
He studied at the National Academy of Design in 1845–46, and exhibited at the American Art Union in 1849–50, the Academy of Design in 1867, and the Boston Art Club in 1877. His studio was at St. Louis. Meeker had a special sympathy with southern scenery, and has successfully rendered the landscapes of Louisiana.

Works

 “The Indian Chief”
 “The Acadians in the Atchafalaya”
 “The Vale of Cashmere”
 “The Lotos Eaters”
 “Louisiana Bayou”
 “The Noon-Day Rest,” from Longfellow's Evangeline
 "Lake Mendota, Madison, Wisconsin"

Notes

References
 
Attribution

1827 births
1887 deaths
20th-century American painters
American male painters
American landscape painters
Artists from St. Louis
Artists from Newark, New Jersey
National Academy of Design alumni
Painters from Missouri
Painters from New Jersey
19th-century American painters
19th-century American male artists
20th-century American male artists